Tom Smith (along with son Matt Smith) are father and son jazz musicians best known for their work in the United States, Eastern Europe and China.

Tom Smith (father) is a long time American university jazz professor, trombonist, researcher, wind symphony conductor, program creator and multiple Senior Fulbright Professor of Music at the Romanian National University of Music and Tibiscus University, with Senior Fulbright Professional Specialist appointments at University KwaZulu-Natal (Durban, South Africa) and the Serbian Academy of Music in Belgrade, as well as numerous American high school and community college positions, alongside an extended professorship at Pfeiffer University, and a three-year appointment as the first full-time American jazz studies professor at a Chinese university. In May 2013, he became the 21st inductee into the DownBeat Jazz Education Hall of Fame. 

Tom was introduced to fine arts at an early age by his father, a noted trombonist, best known for his work with New Orleans traditional jazz artist Murphy Campo. Tom Smith was the longest continuous member of the North Carolina Artist-in-Residence Program (1984–1992), while based at three separate North Carolina community colleges. A widely acknowledged pioneer of the American community jazz movement (having founded over fifty large community jazz ensembles) his best known group was the Unifour Jazz Ensemble, an eighteen-piece big band and first entirely state funded big band in the United States, that placed seventh in the 1988 Down Beat Readers Poll. In that same poll, Smith placed fifth in the trombone category. As an improvising soloist, he has performed and toured with Louie Bellson, Clark Terry, McCoy Tyner, Joe Henderson, Chris Potter, the New York Voices, Nicholas Payton, Herb Ellis, Donald Byrd, Darius Brubeck and the Manhattan Transfer. Smith is also a noted music historian and researcher. In 2001 he and his research partner Gary Westbrook received recognition for identifying the musical fingerprint for identification of unknown personnel on early recordings. This and subsequent research has received widespread media exposure via National Public Radio's Weekly Edition and Tech TV. In 2014, Tom received the Brubeck Award for Jazz Research.

Since 2002, his works in global jazz education have drawn wide attention. Called by a former Fulbright Executive Director the preeminent jazz Fulbright Scholar in the program's history, Smith is the only foreigner to have been awarded The Romanian National Radio Prize. In 2005, he founded and coordinated the Romanian Jazz Education Seminar, the first summer music camp staged in Romania, and cofounded the first western styled jazz music college in that country (2004). In 2006, his Fulbright work in South Africa included extensive assistance with township based initiatives, alongside devising a strategy to link university jazz education with local Zulu musicians. In 2008, Smith was the recipient of the International Association for Jazz Education Jazz Ambassador Award, having already been awarded Outstanding Service to Jazz Education honors in 1998, 2000, 2001, 2002, 2003, 2005 and 2006. In 2009, Tom received his eighth Fulbright Award (a record for musician professors) and accepted residency at the Serbia Academy of Music (University of Arts) drafting the curriculum for their jazz program. Later, he accepted guest jazz studies appointments in Budva, Montenegro. In 2010, Tom and his wife Sarah relocated to Northeast China where he developed a jazz music strategy for teaching English to native Mandarin speakers. In 2011 he was appointed a professor of music at Ningbo University (Zhejiang Province, China) assigned to establish the first entirely functional jazz program on the Chinese mainland, that led to formation of numerous instrumental groups and a 40-member jazz choir. In 2013, Tom was awarded the Camellia Award, for noteworthy artistic contributions towards social betterment for the Greater Ningbo Region. 

Tom wrote a book of Romanian jazz history and criticism called Royal Hipsters of Jazz. In 2017, he wrote Stealth Jazz: Behind the Curtain, and the Native American narrative Tahchee Returns (2016). Summer 2019, he published Stealth Jazz Part II: Educational Dystopia, and The Stealth Jazz Abbreviated Guide to Media (2020). He has also collaborated with Legends Brass to create the Smith Series line of professional trombone mouthpieces.

Matt Smith (son) (born 1989) is a jazz drum set musician, percussionist, hip hop mixologist, and radio/television personality who in 2006, at age 16, won the WFD World's Fastest Drummer Extreme Sport Drumming competition in the Fastest Hands category. Matt is the son and grandson of two accomplished jazz musicians. He was introduced to the drums at age 9, when Louie Bellson (one of his father's performing acquaintances) gave him his first pair of drum sticks. Matt's official début occurred at age 12, when he performed for a jazz combo on Romanian National Television. At age 14, he recorded a début album under his own name (Coltrane Redeux) featuring an all star European jazz lineup. In 2005, Matt entered the Louie Bellson National Drumset Competition, and became the youngest finalist in that competition's history. From 2005-2008 he held a number of speed drumming world records, and in 2007, set the world speed endurance record when he performed 5,132 single strokes in five consecutive minutes. On June 26, 2008 Matt set a traditional grip world speed record, when he recorded 1132 single strokes played in 1 minute - a record formerly held by Dream Theater drummer Mike Mangini. Since 2005, Matt has performed and been interviewed on numerous American media outlets, including PBS, CBS Radio and CNN. In 2008, a PBS news segment featuring Matt and drummer Johnny Rabb was nominated for an Arts and Entertainment News Documentary Emmy Award At age 18, with speed drumming activities behind him, Matt began performing with a variety of diverse world class bands showcasing jazz, rock, hip hop, pop, funk and blues. In 2008 he was named a runner-up in the Rising Star category of the Drum Magazine Readers Poll. Matt is a 2009 graduate of the Atlanta Institute of Music, and from 2009-2011 resided in Europe, where he began production of nu jazz recordings, and performed with a diverse lineup of artists that included jazz pianist Darius Brubeck and Linkin Park singer Mike Shinoda.In 2011, he signed on as house drummer with Euro blues headliner A. G. Weinberger on the  weekly television show Acadeaua. In 2011 Matt relocated to Nashville, TN, where he works as a  touring and session drummer.

References

External links
 Tom Smith Jazz

American jazz musicians
American musical duos
University of North Carolina at Greensboro alumni